Twaandu is a settlement in Makueni County, Eastern Province, Kenya.

Administratively, it is located in the Makindu division of Makueni County. It is part of Twaandu/Kiboko ward of Kibwezi Constituency and Makueni County Council.

The settlement of Kalii is located in the Twaandu location.

References 

Makueni County
Populated places in Eastern Province (Kenya)